Bulnensis also known as  Bulna is a titular episcopal see of the Roman Catholic Church ascribed to  the ecclesiastical province of Africa Proconsularis, as a suffragan of  the  Archdiocese of Carthage.

Very little is known of the ancient diocese. The bishopric is mentioned by Optatus of Milevi who lists the bishop Victor with the Proconsularis bishops at a council of 646. No other bishops are known to us and even the location of Bulna is not known, though doubtless it was in Tunisia.

References

Catholic titular sees in Africa
Roman towns and cities in Africa (Roman province)